The following is a list of episodes for the television show Little House on the Prairie, an American Western drama about a family living on a farm in Walnut Grove, Minnesota from the 1870s to the 1890s. The show is a full-colour version of Laura Ingalls Wilder’s series of Little House books.

The regular series was preceded by the two-hour pilot movie, which first aired on March 30, 1974. The series began on the NBC network on September 11, 1974, and ended on May 10, 1982. Then it was re-tooled as a spin-off sequel series known as Little House: A New Beginning from September 27, 1982 to March 21, 1983–this is generally considered “Season Nine” for purposes of television syndication.

The majority of the episodes run approximately 50 minutes (not counting commercials, they have since been edited for syndication to accommodate more commercial time). Expanded episodes (90 minutes to 2 hours) have been indicated as such; many of these may not currently be shown in some rerun markets due to their length.

Series overview

Pilot movie premiere (1974)

Episodes

Season 1 (1974–75)

Season 2 (1975–76)

Season 3 (1976–77)

Season 4 (1977–78)

Season 5 (1978–79)

Season 6 (1979–80)

Season 7 (1980–81)

Season 8 (1981–82) 
The characters Mary and Adam had taken a back seat and only appeared a handful of times in the 7th season. Melissa Sue Anderson decided to leave the show, and only appeared in 2 episodes of season 8. She appeared briefly in The Reincarnation of Nellie Part 1, and as a guest star in The Christmas They Never Forgot. Subsequently, the shots of her running down the hill with her sisters were removed from the opening theme.

Season 9: A New Beginning (1982–83)
This season (considered as such for syndicated distribution purposes) is also known as Little House: A New Beginning. When Michael Landon decided to stop acting on the show a spin-off sequel was created  with this new name, the focus now being put on the characters of Laura and Almanzo, and more recurring characters were added. Landon did, however, stay on as executive producer, and wrote and directed occasional episodes as well.

Post-series movie specials (1983–84) 
Little House: A New Beginning was followed by three TV movies released between 1983 and 1984.

References

External links 
 
 

Lists of American drama television series episodes
Lists of American Western (genre) television series episodes